Cryptocarenus is a genus of typical bark beetles in the family Curculionidae. There are more than 20 described species in Cryptocarenus.

Species
These 25 species belong to the genus Cryptocarenus:

 Cryptocarenus acaciae Schedl
 Cryptocarenus adustus Eggers, 1933b
 Cryptocarenus amazonicus Wood, 2007
 Cryptocarenus barinensis Wood, 2007
 Cryptocarenus beaveri Wood, 2007
 Cryptocarenus bolivianus Eggers
 Cryptocarenus brasiliensis Wood & Bright, 1992
 Cryptocarenus brevicollis Eggers, 1937a
 Cryptocarenus carabicus Eggers
 Cryptocarenus caraibicus Eggers, 1937a
 Cryptocarenus coronatus Wood, 1971
 Cryptocarenus diadematus Eggers, 1937a
 Cryptocarenus frontalis Wood, 2007
 Cryptocarenus harringtoni Wood & Bright, 1992
 Cryptocarenus heveae Wood & Bright, 1992
 Cryptocarenus laevigatus Wood & Bright, 1992
 Cryptocarenus lepidus Wood, 1971
 Cryptocarenus pilosus Eggers, 1937a
 Cryptocarenus porosus Wood, 1954a
 Cryptocarenus pubescens Wood, 1986c
 Cryptocarenus punctifrons Schedl, 1939d
 Cryptocarenus pygmaeus Schedl
 Cryptocarenus seriatus Eggers, 1933
 Cryptocarenus spatulatus Wood, 1986c
 Cryptocarenus tropicalis Wood, 2007

References

Further reading

 
 
 

Scolytinae
Articles created by Qbugbot